Carcinarctia kivuensis is a moth of the family Erebidae. It was described by James John Joicey and George Talbot in 1924. It is found in the Democratic Republic of the Congo, Tanzania and Zaire.

References

Spilosomina
Moths described in 1924
Insects of the Democratic Republic of the Congo
Moths of Africa